The Brazilian Journal of Physics is a bimonthly peer-reviewed scientific journal covering all areas of physics. It is the official journal of the Brazilian Physical Society and is published on their behalf by Springer Science+Business Media. The journal was established in 1971 as the Revista Brasileira de Física, obtaining its current title in 1992. The editor-in-chief is Antonio Martins Figueiredo Neto (University of São Paulo). 

Besides four regular issues per year, the journal presents special issues focused on hot topics which are particularly well studied in Brazil.

Abstracting and indexing 
The journal is abstracted and indexed in Chemical Abstracts Service, Current Contents/Physical, Chemical and Earth Sciences, INSPEC, Science Citation Index, and Scopus. According to the Journal Citation Reports, the journal has a 2020 impact factor of 1.326.

References

External links 
 

English-language journals
Physics journals
Bimonthly journals
Publications established in 1971
Springer Science+Business Media academic journals
Academic journals associated with learned and professional societies